Berge Fjord (ex Docefjord) was one of the largest ore carriers in the world.

Design 
The ship was built according to double hull technology. Builders utilized the space between double hulls for ballast tanks, which are easier for usage and maintenance, without interfering with the cargo spaces.
The deadweight of Berge Fjord was 310,698 metric tons, the gross tonnage 159,534 and the net tonnage 63,935.

Engineering 
The main engine of Berge Fjord was Sulzer 8RTA84, which provided total power of 25,651 kW to the ship. The main engine technology was based on the common rail engine RTA84. Berge Fjord had fuel consumption of 194 t/day of HFO in service.

References 

BW Fjord (ex Berge Fjord), archived link, 13 June 2012

Very large ore carriers
1985 ships